Prostanoic acid (7-[(1S,2S)-2-octylcyclopentyl]heptanoic acid) is a saturated fatty acid which contains a cyclopentane ring. Its derivatives are prostaglandins - physiologically active lipid substances. Prostanoic acid is not found in nature, but it can be synthesized in vitro.

Synthesis 
For the first time the synthesis of prostanoic acid from 1-formylcyclopentene was considered in detail in the scientific literature in 1975 by a group of French pharmacists. One year later, a group of Japanese scientists, who worked in the central research laboratory of the "Sankyo Co., Ltd." company (Shinagawa, Tokyo), published another method for obtaining prostanoic acid from 2-[4-hydroxy-5-(methoxymethyl)cyclopent-2-en-1-yl] acetic acid. In 1986, a group of Japanese scientists from Kyushu University in Fukuoka proposed their own scheme for obtaining prostanoic acid from limonene.

See also
 Prostaglandin
 Saturated fat
 Fatty acid
 Fatty acid synthesis
 List of saturated fatty acids
 List of unsaturated fatty acids

References

Fatty acids
Lipids
Prostaglandins